Malcolm Edwards (born 25 October 1939) is a footballer who played as a full back in the Football League for Bolton Wanderers, Chester, Tranmere Rovers and Barrow.

References

1939 births
Living people
Footballers from Wrexham
Association football fullbacks
Welsh footballers
Wales under-23 international footballers
Bolton Wanderers F.C. players
Chester City F.C. players
Tranmere Rovers F.C. players
Barrow A.F.C. players
Bangor City F.C. players
English Football League players